Ctenelmis elegans is a species of riffle beetles (insects in the family Elmidae). It is found near rivers in South Africa.

References

External links 

 

Byrrhoidea
Beetles described in 1966
Fauna of South Africa